Kidz Island (or Kids Island) is an Indian Educational Program for kids which airs on DD National in India, featuring Indian Actress Richa Tiwari and Former Child Actor Karan Bhyana on regular basis to host the show.

Overview
The main theme of the show is to educate kids with fun on their Island. In the show, Richa talks about issues like Dental Care, Ayurveda etc. with special guests. Different quiz are played with special kids invited in the show.

References

DD National original programming
Indian children's television series
Television shows set in Delhi
Educational television series